Lolita Laura Morena (born 15 October 1960) is a Swiss model and television hostess.

Miss Switzerland
She was a student of Egyptology when she won the Miss Switzerland pageant in 1982. She went on to represent her country at Miss World 1982 and Miss Universe 1983. Coincidentally she finished as third runner-up in both pageants and was awarded the Miss Photogenic Award twice.

Personal life
At the age of 3, she emigrated to Switzerland with her Mother. Her father died of a heart attack at the age of 26. Her mother, Antonia, settled in Bôle and worked at the “Fabriques de Tabac Réunies” tobacco factory in Neuchâtel.

From 1987 to 2013 she hosted for the Swiss television (TSR) programs such as “Les Coups de cœur d'Alain Morisod” alongside Jean-Marc Richard. “24 et Gagne”, “Fort Boyard Switzerland” and “Potes à pattes”. She also appeared in the “Piques-Meurons” TV show. She presented the Eurovision in 1989 with Jacques Deschenaux.

In the early 1990s, she also worked for foreign television networks, such as RAI in Italy and ARD in Germany. 

In 2009, Lolita began hosting “TOUDOU” and “Tierreport” for the PSA (Swiss League in Defense of Animals), for which she’s also the Executive Producer.

In 2021, Lolita became Co-President of the Neuchâtel Animal Shelter Foundation.

From 1994 to 1999, she was married to German football player Lothar Matthäus with whom she had a son, Loris.

See also
List of Eurovision Song Contest presenters

References

External links

Miss Switzerland official site

1960 births
Living people
Miss Switzerland winners
Miss Universe 1983 contestants
Miss World 1982 delegates
People from the Province of Pesaro and Urbino
Swiss people of Italian descent
Swiss television personalities